Sir John Clerk of Penicuik, 2nd Baronet (1676–1755) was a Scottish politician, lawyer, judge and composer.

He was Vice-President of the Philosophical Society of Edinburgh, the pre-eminent learned society of the Scottish Enlightenment.

He was the father of George Clerk Maxwell and John Clerk of Eldin, and the great-great-grandfather of the famous physicist James Clerk Maxwell.

Early life

John Clerk was son of Sir John Clerk, 1st Baronet by his first wife Elizabeth, daughter of Henry Henderson of Elvington.
 He had a legal education first at University of Glasgow and then at Leiden University. During 1697 and 1698 he went on a Grand Tour and in 1700 was admitted to the Scottish Bar.

Between 1700 and 1730 he planted 300,000 trees on the grounds of the family estate at Penicuik House.

Parliament

He was a member of the Parliament of Scotland for Whithorn from 1702 to 1707, and a Commissioner for the Union of Parliaments for the Whig Party: he sat in the first Parliament of Great Britain in 1707.

He was appointed a Baron of the Exchequer for Scotland on the constitution of the Exchequer Court, 13 May 1708, a position he held for nearly half a century. With Baron Scrope, in 1726, he drew up an Historical View of the Forms and Powers of the Court of Exchequer in Scotland, which was printed at the expense of the Barons of Exchequer for private circulation.

A leading supporter of the Act of Union 1707 with the Kingdom of England, Clerk wrote in his memoirs of English novelist, journalist and secret agent Daniel Defoe that it was not known at the time that Defoe had been sent by Godolphin : "... to give a faithful account to him from time to time how everything past here. He was therefor a spy among us, but not known to be such, otherways the Mob of Edin. had pull him to pieces".

Antiquarian leanings

Of his other treatises, Clerk wrote papers in the Philosophical Transactions: one an Account of the Stylus of the Ancients and their different sorts of Paper, printed in 1731, and the others On the effects of Thunder on Trees and Of a large Deer's Horns found in the heart of an Oak, printed in 1739. He was the author of a tract entitled Dissertatio de quibusdam Monumentis Romanis &c, written in 1730 but not published until 1750. For upwards of twenty years he also carried on a learned correspondence with Roger Gale, the English antiquary, which forms a portion of the Reliquiae Britannica of 1782.

Patron of the arts

Sir John Clerk was one of the friends and patrons of the poet Allan Ramsay who, during his latter years, spent much of his time at Penicuik House. His son, Sir James Clerk, erected at the family seat an obelisk to Ramsay's memory. Sir John was a patron to various other artists and architects, and even dabbled in architecture himself.

Musical talent

Clerk had a musical bent also, and while in Rome may have been tutored by the Baroque composer Arcangelo Corelli, but his own work has often been overlooked, primarily since the only record of his composition seems to be his own papers. One of his humorous songs was O merry may the maid be that marries the miller.

Family

Sir John succeeded his father in his title and estates in 1722. He unsuccessfully courted Susanna, daughter of Sir Archibald Kennedy of Culzean, Baronet (ancestor of the Marquess of Ailsa) and that correspondence is in the National Archives. She became the third wife of Alexander, 9th Earl of Eglinton.

He married, firstly, on 23 February 1701, Lady Margaret, eldest daughter of Alexander Stewart, 3rd Earl of Galloway who died in childbirth on 26 December that year. Her son, John, survived, but died unmarried in 1722. Sir John married again, to Janet, daughter of Sir John Inglis of Cramond, by whom he had seven sons and six daughters. He died at Penicuik House on 4 October 1755.

Notes
Footnotes

Citations

References
 Allsop, Peter (1999).	Arcangelo Corelli: new Orpheus of our times Oxford monographs on music, Oxford University Press, 
Anderson, William (1867), The Scottish Nation, Edinburgh, Vol. III, p. 653-4.
Backscheider, Paula R. (1989).	Daniel Defoe: his life, Johns Hopkins University Press, 
John Burke (1832) A General and heraldic dictionary of the peerage and baronetage of the British Empire, Volume 1, H. Colburn and R. Bentley.
Colvin, Howard (2008). A biographical dictionary of British architects, 1600-1840, Edition	4, Yale University Press, . Clerk, Sir John (1676–1755), pp. 257–259.
Trevelyan, George Macaulay (1946).England under Queen Anne, Volume 2, Longmans, Green and Co.
Wilson, John James (1891). The annals of Penicuik: being a history of the parish and of the village, Priv. Print. by T.& A. Constable,
The Clerk Family, Penicuik House Project, Retrieved 9 December 2009.

Attribution

Further reading
Clerk, John, Sir, 1676–1755; (Editor: Gray, John Miller, 1850–1894). Memoirs of the life of Sir John Clerk of Penicuik, baronet, baron of the Exchequer, extracted by himself from his own journals, 1676-1755, Edinburgh, Printed at the University press by T. and A. Constable for the Scottish history society, 1892. On the website of The Internet Archive, retrieved 2009-12-09

External links

 Digitised scores of his musical works can be viewed through the Five Centuries of Scottish Music collection hosted by AHDS Performing Arts
 A recording of his cantatas is available from Hyperion 

1676 births
1755 deaths
People from Midlothian
Baronets in the Baronetage of Nova Scotia
Scottish Baroque composers
Scottish classical composers
British male classical composers
Barons of the Court of Exchequer (Scotland)
Burgh Commissioners to the Parliament of Scotland
Members of the Parliament of Scotland 1702–1707
Members of the Parliament of Great Britain for Scottish constituencies
Whig (British political party) MPs for Scottish constituencies
Alumni of the University of Glasgow
Leiden University alumni
Members of the Faculty of Advocates
Politics of Dumfries and Galloway
People associated with Dumfries and Galloway
Scottish legal writers
Scottish unionists
Members of the Philosophical Society of Edinburgh
Fellows of the Royal Society
British MPs 1707–1708
18th-century classical composers
18th-century male musicians
18th-century musicians
18th-century Scottish musicians